The 1915 St Helens by-election was held on 24 November 1915.  The by-election was held due to the incumbent Conservative MP, Rigby Swift, becoming Recorder of Wigan.  It was retained by Rigby Swift who was unopposed due to a War-time electoral pact, one of twenty six unopposed by-elections that year.

References

1915 elections in the United Kingdom
1915 in England
1910s in Lancashire
Politics of the Metropolitan Borough of St Helens
By-elections to the Parliament of the United Kingdom in Merseyside constituencies
By-elections to the Parliament of the United Kingdom in Lancashire constituencies
Unopposed by-elections to the Parliament of the United Kingdom (need citation)